Sam Golzari (born 12 July 1979) is a British actor of Iranian descent active in the United States. He is known for his debut role in American Dreamz.

Golzari was born in Hammersmith, London, England, to parents of Persian origin. He received his BA from UCLA in 2003, where he worked in the Conservatory Acting Program.

Golzari got his start at the age of four as a Michael Jackson impersonator. Besides his work at UCLA, Golzari has also been a lab member of the Latino Theater Company under Jose Luis Valenzuela. Golzari's plans were to stay in the theater, but while at college he started working on student films. It was there that he began to find a love for the craft of filmmaking. His short film The Break won an award for the "best ensemble cast" at the Method Fest film festival.  After this, he got his TV debut when the Showtime network aired his film The Invisible Man, directed by UCLA film student Angela Mrema.

After college graduation, Golzari landed the first Hollywood film for which he auditioned, American Dreamz.  In the film he stars alongside Hugh Grant, Mandy Moore and Dennis Quaid. Since that film, he plays the role of Kameron in the film 21 alongside Jim Sturgess and Kevin Spacey. He has also worked with Tony Shalhoub on the film AmericanEast, as well as an all-improv mockumentary, Juan Francis: Live, produced by Norman Lear.

Golzari is also a founding member of the LA-based band the Elevaters, who have released a self-titled EP as well as a full-length album entitled "Rising."

He has also appeared in 2016 American film, Jimmy Vestvood: Amerikan Hero.

References

External links

1979 births
English expatriates in the United States
English male film actors
English people of Iranian descent
Living people
Male actors from London
People from Hammersmith
UCLA Film School alumni
20th-century English male actors
English male television actors